Yaimil José Medina Rodríguez (born 24 July 1999) is a Venezuelan footballer who plays as a right winger for Mineros de Guayana.

Club career
Born in Puerto Ordaz, Medina was a Mineros de Guayana youth graduate. He made his first team – and Primera División – debut on 20 March 2016, aged just 16, coming on as a second-half substitute in a 1–0 away win against Deportivo JBL.

Medina scored his first goal on 27 January 2018, netting the game's only in an away defeat of Deportivo Anzoátegui. On 21 June, he moved abroad and joined Albacete Balompié, being initially assigned to the reserves in Tercera División.

On 18 June 2019, after scoring 12 goals for Alba's B-team, Medina was loaned to Segunda División B side Marbella FC, for one year. On 27 July of the following year, he moved to fellow third division side Recreativo de Huelva also in a temporary deal.

References

External links

1998 births
Living people
People from Ciudad Guayana
Venezuelan footballers
Association football wingers
Venezuelan Primera División players
A.C.C.D. Mineros de Guayana players
Primera Federación players
Segunda División B players
Tercera División players
Atlético Albacete players
Marbella FC players
Recreativo de Huelva players
Albacete Balompié players
Venezuelan expatriate footballers
Venezuelan expatriate sportspeople in Spain
Expatriate footballers in Spain